Joseph Hodges Choate (January 24, 1832 – May 14, 1917) was an American lawyer and diplomat.  Choate was associated with many of the most famous litigations in American legal history, including the Kansas prohibition cases, the Chinese exclusion cases, the Isaac H. Maynard election returns case, the Income Tax Suit, and the Samuel J. Tilden, Jane Stanford, and Alexander Turney Stewart will cases. In the public sphere, he was influential in the founding of the Metropolitan Museum of Art.

Early life
Choate was born in Salem, Massachusetts on January 24, 1832.  He was the son of Margaret Manning (née Hodges) Choate and physician George Choate.  Among his siblings were William Gardner Choate, a United States district judge of the United States District Court for the Southern District of New York, Dr. George Cheyne Shattuck Choate, and a sister, Caroline Choate.

His father's first cousin (his first cousin once removed) was Rufus Choate, a U.S. Representative and U.S. Senator from Massachusetts.  His paternal grandparents were George Choate and Susanna Choate, and his maternal grandparents were Gamaliel Hodges and Sarah (née Williams) Hodges.

Choate graduated from Harvard College in 1852 and Harvard Law School in 1854.

Career

After graduation from law school, Choate was admitted first to the Massachusetts in 1855, followed by admission to the New York bar in 1856, after which he entered the law office of Scudder & Carter in New York City.

His success in his profession was immediate, and in 1860 he became junior partner in the firm of Evarts, Southmayd & Choate, the senior partner in which was William M. Evarts. This firm and its successor, that of Evarts, Choate & Beaman, remained for many years among the leading law firms of New York and of the country, the activities of both being national rather than local.

During these busy years, Choate was associated with many of the most famous legal cases in American legal history, including the Tilden, Alexander Turney Stewart, and Jane Stanford will cases, the Kansas prohibition cases, the Chinese exclusion cases (in which he argued against the law's validity), the Isaac H. Maynard election returns case, and the Income Tax Suit.  In 1871, he became a member of the Committee of Seventy in New York City, which was instrumental in breaking up the Tweed Ring, and later assisted in the prosecution of the indicted officials. He served as president of the American Bar Association, the New York State Bar Association, and the New York City Bar Association.  In the retrial of the General Fitz-John Porter case, he obtained a reversal of the decision of the original court-martial.

His greatest reputation was won perhaps in cross-examination.  In politics, he allied himself with the Republican Party on its organization, being a frequent speaker in presidential campaigns, beginning with that of 1856. He never held political office, although he was a candidate for the Republican U.S. senatorial nomination for New York against Senator Thomas C. Platt in 1897. During this time he was a "true believer" in the cause of Cuban independence, being heavily informed and swayed by Cuban exiles in New York City, including Tomás Estrada Palma.  In 1894, he was president of the New York state constitutional convention.

U.S. Ambassador to the United Kingdom
He was appointed, by President McKinley, U.S. Ambassador to the United Kingdom to succeed John Hay in 1899, and remained in this position after Theodore Roosevelt's ascendancy to the presidency until the spring of 1905.  In England, he won great personal popularity, and accomplished much in fostering the good relations of the two great English-speaking powers. He represented the president at the funeral of Queen Victoria. He was one of the representatives of the United States at the Second Hague Peace Conference in 1907.

Later life
Upon the outbreak of the World War I, he ardently supported the cause of the Allies. He severely criticized President Wilson's hesitation to recommend America's immediate cooperation, but shortly before his death retracted his criticism. He was chairman of the mayor's committee in New York for entertaining the British and French commissions in 1917. His death was hastened by the physical strain of his constant activities in this connection.

Personal life

On October 16, 1861, he married Caroline Dutcher Sterling Choate (1837–1929), who had been born in Salisbury, Connecticut. She was the daughter of Caroline Mary (née Dutcher) Sterling and Frederick Augustine Sterling and a distant relative of Frederick A. Sterling.  Caroline was an artist and an advocate for women's education, helping to establish both Brearley School and Barnard College.

Joseph and Caroline were the parents of five children, two of whom predeceased their parents:

 Ruluff Sterling Choate (September 24, 1864 – April 5, 1884)
 George Choate (born January 28, 1867 – 1937)
 Josephine Choate (January 9, 1869 – July 20, 1896)
 Mabel Choate (December 26, 1870 – 1958), who did not marry and became a gardener and philanthropist.
 Joseph Hodges Choate Jr. (February 2, 1876 – 1968), who married Cora Lyman Oliver, daughter of General Robert Shaw Oliver, in 1903.

The family owned a large country house, known as Naumkeag, which was designed by Stanford White and is today open to the public as a nonprofit museum in Stockbridge, Massachusetts.

Choate died on May 14, 1917 at his residence, 8 East 63rd Street in Manhattan.  
His funeral was held on May 17 at St. Bartholomew's Church in New York, where it was attended by the British Ambassador, Sir Cecil Spring-Rice, the French Minister of Education, M. Hovelacque, and the Assistant Secretary of State, William Phillips, among many others. He was buried in the Stockbridge Cemetery in Stockbridge, Massachusetts. Memorial services were held on May 22 in London, England, and on May 31 at Trinity Church on Wall Street.

Descendants
Through his granddaughter, Helen Choate Platt (1906–1974), he is the great-grandfather of diplomat Nicholas Platt (b. 1936), the former U.S. Ambassador to Zambia, the Philippines, and Pakistan; and the great-great-grandfather of actor Oliver Platt (b. 1960).

Honors and legacy
He was awarded an honorary doctorate (LL.D.) by the University of Edinburgh in March 1900; another LL.D. from Yale University in October 1901, during celebrations for the bicentenary of the university; an honorary doctorate (D.C.L.) by the University of Oxford in June 1902; and an honorary degree by the University of St Andrews in October 1902.

In 1919, two years after his death, members of the Harvard Club of New York City established the Joseph Hodges Choate Memorial Fellowship at Harvard University to commemorate his life and legacy. It is awarded each year to a student from the University of Cambridge on the recommendation of the Cambridge Vice-Chancellor for study in any Department of Harvard University. The Fellow resides in the Choate Suite in John Winthrop House and their name is recorded on a board in the House Dining Hall.

Published works

References

External links

 
 
 
 

1832 births
1917 deaths
Harvard Law School alumni
People from Stockbridge, Massachusetts
Ambassadors of the United States to the United Kingdom
Choate family
People from Salem, Massachusetts
Presidents of the New York City Bar Association
New York (state) Republicans
Carnegie Endowment for International Peace
Harvard College alumni
Burials at Woodlawn Cemetery (Bronx, New York)
19th-century American diplomats
20th-century American diplomats